This is a list of spacecraft powered by non-rechargeable batteries. While most spacecraft are powered by longer-lasting power sources such as solar cells or radioisotope thermoelectric generators, which can provide power for years to decades, some have been powered by primary (non-rechargeable) electrochemical cells, which provide runtimes of minutes to months. This is typically done only on spacecraft that are planned to operate for only a short time, even if they must travel for a long time before being activated. Some spacecraft classes where this applies are atmospheric probes, short-duration landers, and technology demonstrators. Some early Earth satellites, such as the first Sputnik and Explorer satellites, also used primary batteries, before solar panels were widely adopted.

Uncrewed

Primary power comes from a chemical battery, but a secondary system exists. For example, Luna 9 ran out of power after three days.

Crewed
early Gemini with on silver-zinc (Ag-Zn), later hydrogen-oxygen fuel cells
Mercury
Apollo Lunar Lander, Ag-Zn 
Soyuz 7K-T
Vostok
Voskhod

See also
Lists of spacecraft
Solar panels on spacecraft
List of passive satellites
Batteries in space

References

External links
Lithium-Sulfix Dioxide Batteries on Mars Rovers
Planetary Landers and Entry Probes

Non-rechargeable batteries
Battery (electricity)